Celaenia is a genus of South Pacific orb-weaver spiders first described by Tamerlan Thorell in 1868.

Species
 it contains eleven species:
Celaenia atkinsoni (O. Pickard-Cambridge, 1880) – Australia, Tasmania, New Zealand
Celaenia calotoides Rainbow, 1908 – Australia (New South Wales)
Celaenia distincta (O. Pickard-Cambridge, 1869) – Australia (New South Wales, Tasmania)
Celaenia dubia (O. Pickard-Cambridge, 1869) – Australia (New South Wales, Victoria)
Celaenia excavata (L. Koch, 1867) – Australia, New Zealand
Celaenia hectori (O. Pickard-Cambridge, 1880) – New Zealand
Celaenia olivacea (Urquhart, 1885) – New Zealand
Celaenia penna (Urquhart, 1887) – New Zealand
Celaenia tuberosa (Urquhart, 1889) – New Zealand
Celaenia tumidosa Urquhart, 1891 – Australia (Tasmania)
Celaenia voraginosa Urquhart, 1891 – Australia (Tasmania)

References 

Araneidae
Spiders of Australia
Spiders of New Zealand
Araneomorphae genera
Taxa named by Tamerlan Thorell